Hassan Shehata (born 19 June 1947) is an Egyptian former professional football player. Before retirement he played as a forward. He then became a football manager, who is now retired. Shehata led Egypt to victory in 3 titles, all which were at the African Cup of Nations: 2006, 2008 and 2010. He was the first ever coach to win three consecutive Africa Cup of Nations titles. Shehata is one of only two coaches to win the Africa Cup 3 times, along with Ghana's Charles Gyamfi.

Club career statistics

Managerial career
In 2004, Shehata became Egypt's national team coach after the sacking of Italian coach Marco Tardelli. In the 2006 African Cup of Nations, hosted by Egypt, he led the team to its first Cup of Nations in eight years, defeating the Ivory Coast in the final.

During the African Cup semi-final against Senegal, Shehata had a serious argument with one of his players, Mido. That was a resultant of Mido reacting negatively to being substituted. Shehata was vindicated minutes later when Amr Zaki, the player replacing Mido, scored the winning goal; which took Egypt to the final. Shehata did allow Mido to accept his medal at the closing ceremonies of the African Cup of Nations. Following the incident in a few days, Mido issued a public apology.

As mentioned earlier, Shehata led Egypt to three successive titles at the African Cup of Nations in 2006, 2008 and 2010. Thus, Egypt became the first African nation to achieve such record. Consequently, the Egyptian team were ranked as high as 9th in the FIFA World Rankings. Due to his great coaching ability throughout during that period, In 2008, he was awarded the title of CAF Coach of the Year.

In 2010, FFHSI  had ranked him as the best African Coach. He was also selected as one of the top five African coaches internationally.

In 2015, he became President of the SATUC Football Cup, a new charitable global football competition for U16 orphans, refugees and disadvantaged children.

References

1947 births
Living people
Zamalek SC players
Al-Wasl F.C. managers
Egyptian football managers
Egyptian footballers
Egypt international footballers
Zamalek SC managers
Kazma SC players
Expatriate footballers in Kuwait
Egypt national football team managers
Al Ittihad Alexandria Club managers
Petrojet SC managers
2009 FIFA Confederations Cup managers
African Games medalists in football
1974 African Cup of Nations players
1976 African Cup of Nations players
1978 African Cup of Nations players
Egyptian expatriate sportspeople in Libya
1980 African Cup of Nations players
Egyptian expatriate sportspeople in Kuwait
Egyptian expatriate sportspeople in Qatar
Al-Arabi SC (Qatar) managers
2006 Africa Cup of Nations managers
2008 Africa Cup of Nations managers
2010 Africa Cup of Nations managers
Association football forwards
Egyptian Premier League players
People from Beheira Governorate
Al Mokawloon Al Arab SC managers
Footballers at the 1973 All-Africa Games
Fujairah FC managers
Kuwait Premier League players
Egyptian expatriate sportspeople in Sudan
Egyptian expatriate sportspeople in Morocco
Egyptian expatriate sportspeople in the United Arab Emirates
Expatriate football managers in Qatar
Expatriate football managers in the United Arab Emirates
Expatriate football managers in Sudan
Expatriate football managers in Libya
Expatriate football managers in Morocco
Al-Ahly SC (Benghazi) managers
Difaâ Hassani El Jadidi managers
Al-Merrikh SC managers
African Games bronze medalists for Egypt